Margrave William Christopher of Baden (12 October 1628 – 25 August 1652) was a margrave of Baden and canon at Cologne.

He is a son of Margrave William I of Baden-Baden from his first marriage to Countess Catherine Ursula of Hohenzollern-Hechingen (died: 2 June 1640), the daughter of Count John George of Hohenzollern-Hechingen.

Margraves of Baden-Baden
1628 births
1652 deaths
17th-century German people
House of Zähringen
Sons of monarchs